Tolchin may refer to:

 Tolchin, English surname of Ukrainian origin
 Mount Tolchin, in the Patuxent Range, Antarctica